1928 in philosophy

Events

Publications 
 Konstantin Tsiolkovsky, The Will of the Universe: The Unknown Intelligence (1928)
 Rudolf Carnap, The Logical Structure of the World (1928) and Pseudoproblems in Philosophy (1928)
 Helmuth Plessner, Die Stufen des Organischen und der Mensch (in German, not yet translated into English, 1928)

Philosophical literature 
 Stefan George, The New Empire (originally published in German as Das Neue Reich, 1928)

Births 
 February 26 - Odo Marquard (died 2015)
 March 19 - Hans Küng 
 May 4 - Elemér Hankiss, Hungarian sociologist and philosopher (died 2015)
 July 15 - Nicholas Rescher 
 September 6 - Robert M. Pirsig (died 2017)
 September 14 - Humberto Maturana 
 October 2 - Wolfhart Pannenberg (died 2014)
 October 4 - Alvin Toffler (died 2016)
 December 7 - Noam Chomsky 
 December 13 - Solomon Feferman (died 2016)
 December 16 - Philip K. Dick (died 1982)

Deaths 
 May 19 - Max Scheler (born 1874)

References 

Philosophy
20th-century philosophy
Philosophy by year